Events from the year 1980 in the United States.

Incumbents

Federal government 
 President: Jimmy Carter (D-Georgia) 
 Vice President: Walter Mondale (D-Minnesota) 
 Chief Justice: Warren E. Burger (Minnesota)
 Speaker of the House of Representatives: Tip O'Neill (D-Massachusetts)
 Senate Majority Leader: Robert Byrd (D-West Virginia) 
 Congress: 96th

Events

January

 January 1 – The comic strip The Far Side debuts in newspapers.
 January 4 – U.S. President Jimmy Carter proclaims a grain embargo against the USSR with the support of the European Commission.
 January 6 – Global Positioning System time epoch begins at 00:00 UTC.
 January 7 – U.S. President Jimmy Carter signs legislation approving $1.5 billion in loan guarantees to bail out the Chrysler Corporation.
 January 20 – Super Bowl XIV: The Pittsburgh Steelers become the first NFL franchise to win four Super Bowls, defeating the Los Angeles Rams 31–19 at the Rose Bowl in Pasadena, California. The game was shown to the Americans held hostage in Iran.
 January 24
The Chicago, Rock Island and Pacific Railroad is ordered liquidated due to bankruptcy and debt owed to creditors.
The 5.8  Livermore earthquake shakes the East Bay area of California with a maximum Mercalli intensity of VII (Very strong). This first event in a doublet earthquake is followed two days later by a 5.4  shock. Total financial losses from the events is $11.5 million.
 January 27 – Canadian Caper: Six United States diplomats, posing as Canadians, manage to escape from Tehran, Iran as they board a flight to Zürich, Switzerland.
 January 28 - The 180' coast guard buoy tender USCGC BLACKTHORN collided with the 600' tanker SS CAPRICORN in the Tampa Bay shipping channel.  The coast guard vessel capsized and sank after becoming entangled in CAPRICORN'S anchor chain.   23 of BLACKTHORN'S 50 crew members perished in the accident.

February

 February 2–3 – The New Mexico State Penitentiary Riot takes place; 33 inmates are killed and more than 100 inmates injured.
 February 2 – Abscam: FBI personnel target members of the Congress of the United States in a sting operation.
 February 13 – The XIII Winter Olympics open in Lake Placid, New York.
 February 15 – David Sanborn releases his fourth solo studio album, Hideaway, in the United States.
 February 22 – The United States Olympic Hockey Team defeats the Soviet Union in the medal round of the Winter Olympics, in the Miracle on Ice.

March
 March 1 – The Voyager 1 probe confirms the existence of Janus, a moon of Saturn.
 March 5 – Channel Islands National Park is established.
 March 21 
Mafioso Angelo Bruno is assassinated in Philadelphia.
U.S. President Jimmy Carter announces that the United States will boycott the 1980 Summer Olympics in Moscow.
 March 22 – The Georgia Guidestones are erected in Elbert County, Georgia.
 March 27 – Silver Thursday: A steep fall in silver prices, resulting from the Hunt Brothers attempting to corner the market in silver, leads to panic on commodity and futures exchanges.
 March 31 – Chicago, Rock Island and Pacific Railroad operates its final train.

April

 April 1 
 The 1980 United States Census begins. There are 226,545,805 United States residents on this day.
 New York City's Transport Works Union Local 100 goes on strike, which continues for 11 days.
 April 7 – The United States severs diplomatic relations with Iran and imposes economic sanctions, following the taking of American hostages on November 4, 1979.
 April 14 – The 52nd Academy Awards ceremony, hosted by Johnny Carson, is held at Dorothy Chandler Pavilion in Los Angeles. Robert Benton's Kramer vs. Kramer wins five awards, including Best Picture and Best Director. The film is tied with Bob Fosse's All That Jazz in receiving nine nominations. 8-year-old Justin Henry, nominated for Best Supporting Actor, notably becomes the youngest Oscar nominee in any category.
 April 15 – A mass exodus of Cubans to the United States known as the Mariel boatlift begins. It ends on October 31 by agreement between the two countries.
 April 21 – Rosie Ruiz wins the Boston Marathon, but is later exposed as a fraud and stripped of her award.
 April 24–25 – Operation Eagle Claw, a commando mission in Iran to rescue American embassy hostages, is aborted after mechanical problems ground the rescue helicopters. Eight United States troops are killed in a mid-air collision during the failed operation.
 April 24 – Pennsylvania Lottery Scandal: the Pennsylvania Lottery is rigged by six men including the host of the live TV drawing, Nick Perry.

May

 May 3 – Cari Lightner, a 13-year-old girl, is killed by a drunk driver in Fair Oaks, California. Her mother, Candy, forms the organization Mothers Against Drunk Driving.
 May 4 – The Department of Health, Education, and Welfare splits into the Department of Education and the Department of Health and Human Services.
 May 7 – Paul Geidel, convicted of second-degree murder in 1911, is released from prison in Beacon, New York, after 68 years and 245 days (the longest-ever time served by an inmate).
 May 9 
James Alexander George Smith "Jags" McCartney, the Turks and Caicos Islands' first Chief Minister, is killed in a plane crash over New Jersey.
In Florida, the Liberian freighter Summit Venture hits the Sunshine Skyway Bridge over Tampa Bay, sending 35 people (most of whom were in a bus) to a watery death as a 1,400-foot section of the bridge collapses.
In Norco, California, 5 men robbed a bank, leading to a shootout and pursuit that left 2 of the robbers dead, 1 sheriff deputy killed, 33 police vehicles destroyed, and 11 people, consisting of 8 officers, a civilian, and 2 other perpetrators wounded.
 May 11 – Mobster Henry Hill is arrested for drug possession.
 May 16 
 Rookie Magic Johnson scores 42 points to lead the Los Angeles Lakers to a 123–107 victory over the Philadelphia 76ers to clinch the National Basketball Association championship for the Lakers, who prevail despite the absence of future Basketball Hall of Fame center Kareem Abdul-Jabbar.
 The Department of Education begins operations.
 May 17 – A Miami, Florida court acquits four white police officers of killing Arthur McDuffie, a black insurance executive, provoking three days of race riots.
 May 18 – Mount St. Helens erupts in Washington, killing 57 and causing US$3 billion in damage.
 May 21 – The Empire Strikes Back is released.
 May 22 – Pac-Man, the best-selling arcade game of all time, is released.
 May 23 – Stanley Kubrick's horror film, The Shining, based on the 1977 novel of the same name, is released.
 May 24 
The New York Islanders win their first Stanley Cup, from a goal by Bobby Nystrom in overtime of game six of the Stanley Cup playoffs' final round.
The International Court of Justice calls for the release of U.S. Embassy hostages in Tehran.
 May 25 – Indianapolis 500: Johnny Rutherford wins for a third time in car owner Jim Hall's revolutionary ground effect Chaparral car; the victory is Hall's second as an owner.
 May 29 – Vernon Jordan is shot and critically injured in an assassination attempt in Fort Wayne, Indiana by Joseph Paul Franklin (the first major news story for CNN).

June
 June – The 1980 recession ends.
 June 1 – The Cable News Network (CNN) is officially launched.
 June 3
U.S. Senator Ted Kennedy wins several primaries, including California, on 'Super Tuesday', but not enough to overtake President Jimmy Carter for the Democratic Party nomination.
A series of deadly tornadoes strikes Grand Island, Nebraska, causing over US$300 million in damage, killing five people and injuring over 250.
 June 9 – In Los Angeles, comedian Richard Pryor is badly burned trying to freebase cocaine.
 June 10 – A Unabomber bomb injures United Airlines president Percy Wood in Lake Forest, Illinois.
 June 20 – Augusta AVA becomes the first federally recognized American Viticultural Area.
 June 23–September 6 – The 1980 United States heat wave claims 1,700 lives.
 June 27 – U.S. President Jimmy Carter signs Proclamation 4771, requiring 19 and 20-year-old males to register for a peacetime military draft, in response to the Soviet invasion of Afghanistan.

July

 July – The unemployment rate peaks at 7.8%, the highest in four years.
 July 15 – A severe and destructive thunderstorm strikes four counties in western Wisconsin, including the city of Eau Claire. It causes over US$250 million in damage, and one person is killed.
 July 16 – Former California Governor and actor Ronald Reagan is nominated for U.S. President, at the Republican National Convention in Detroit, Michigan. Influenced by the Religious Right, the convention also drops its long standing support for the Equal Rights Amendment, dismaying moderate Republicans.

August
 August 10 – Hurricane Allen, after becoming a Category 5 storm and the strongest hurricane of the season, hits southeastern Texas as a Category 3.
 August 14
 U.S. President Jimmy Carter defeats Senator Ted Kennedy to win renomination at the 1980 Democratic National Convention in New York City.
 Actress Dorothy Stratten is murdered in Los Angeles (southern California), apparently raped and shot by her estranged husband Paul Snider before he kills himself.
 August 26–27 – Harvey's Resort Hotel bombing in Stateline, Nevada, part of an extortion plot.

September
 September 18–19 – 1980 Damascus Titan missile explosion: Liquid fuel in an LGM-25C Titan II intercontinental ballistic missile explodes at a missile launch facility north of Damascus, Arkansas.
 September 19 – The Robert Redford-directed film Ordinary People, based on the novel by Judith Guest, premieres. Redford's directorial debut later wins him his first Oscar, and wins three other Academy Awards, and five Golden Globe awards.
 September 21 – Ronald Reagan and independent candidate John B. Anderson participate in the first debate of the 1980 presidential election.
 September 29 – The Washington Post publishes Janet Cooke's story of Jimmy, an 8-year-old heroin addict (later proven to be fabricated).
 September 30 – Digital Equipment Corporation, Intel and Xerox introduce the DIX standard for Ethernet, which is the first implementation outside of Xerox, and the first to support 10 Mbit/s speeds.

October
 October 14 – The Staggers Rail Act is enacted, deregulating American railroads.
 October 15 – James Hoskins murdered his girlfriend earlier that morning and forced his way into WCPO's television studio in Cincinnati, holding nine employees hostage for several hours before releasing them and taking his own life.
 October 21 – World Series: The Philadelphia Phillies beat the Kansas City Royals, 4 games to 2, to win their first World Series Title.
 October 28 – U.S. President Jimmy Carter and Ronald Reagan debate in Cleveland, Ohio. Reagan's genial, witty performance causes him to overtake Carter in the polls.

November

 November 4 – 1980 United States presidential election: Republican challenger and former Governor Ronald Reagan of California defeats incumbent Democratic President Jimmy Carter, exactly one year after the beginning of the Iran hostage crisis.
 November 8 – The 7.3  Eureka earthquake shook the North Coast of California with a maximum Mercalli intensity of VII (Very strong), causing six injuries and $2–2.75 million in losses.
 November 10 – November 12 – Voyager program: The NASA space probe Voyager I makes its closest approach to Saturn, when it flies within  of the planet's cloud-tops and sends the first high resolution images of the world back to scientists on Earth.
 November 20 – A Texaco oil rig breaks through to a mine under Lake Peigneur.
 November 21
Millions of viewers tune into the U.S. soap opera Dallas to learn who shot lead character J. R. Ewing. The "Who shot J. R.?" event is a national obsession.
MGM Grand fire: A fire at the MGM Grand Hotel and Casino on the Las Vegas Strip kills 85 people.

December

 December 8 
 John Lennon is shot and killed by Mark David Chapman in front of The Dakota apartment building in New York City.
 Berkeley Breathed's comic strip Bloom County debuts in newspapers.
 December 11 – CERCLA is enacted by the U.S. Congress.
 December 14 – Four people are murdered and four others are injured by two armed robbers at Bob's Big Boy on La Cienega Boulevard in Los Angeles.
 December 26 – Richard Chase, the "Vampire of Sacramento," kills himself by overdose at San Quentin State Prison.

Recent or Ongoing events
 Cold War (1947–1991)
 1970s energy crisis (1973–1980)
 Iran hostage crisis (1979–1981)

Births

January

 January 1
 Maggie Behle, Paralympic alpine skier
 Chris Brunt, soccer player
 January 2
 Mac Danzig, mixed martial artist  
 Robert Rivas, politician
 Brent Sass, dog musher
 January 3
 Rob Arnold, lead guitarist for Chimaira (1999-2013) and rhythm guitarist for Six Feet Under (2011-2012)
 Eli Crane, Navy SEAL and politician
 Telly Leung, actor and singer/songwriter  
 Mary Wineberg, Olympic sprinter
 January 4 
 Erin Cahill, actress
 D'Arcy Carden, actress and comedian
 Greg Cipes, voice, film, and television actor
 January 5
 Garette Ratliff Henson, actor
 Bennie Joppru, football player
 Jill Krowinski, politician
 January 6 – Pascual Romero, musician
 January 7
 Tonya Cooley, television personality
 Ivan Moody, singer/songwriter and frontman for Five Finger Death Punch
 January 8
 Shelly Boshart Davis, politician
 Rachel Nichols, actress
 January 9 – Clark Barwick, mathematician and college professor
 January 10 – Sarah Shahi, actress
 January 11
 James Adkisson, football player
 Lovieanne Jung, softball player
 January 12 – Amerie, singer
 January 13 – LaKisha Jones, singer
 January 14
 Amber Brock, author 
 Cory Gibbs, soccer player 
 January 15
 Tommy Adams, basketball player
 Scott Amron, conceptual artist and electrical engineer
 Tom Baehr-Jones, physicist
 Jason Capel, basketball coach 
 January 16
 Mike Ayers, ice hockey player
 Lin-Manuel Miranda, playwright and composer
 January 17
 T. J. Bohn, baseball player
 Zooey Deschanel, actress and musician
 Maksim Chmerkovskiy, Ukrainian-born dance champion, choreographer and instructor
 January 18
 Illogic, hip hop artist
 Julius Peppers, football player  
 Jason Segel, actor and comedian
 January 19 – Blake Burdette, rugby player and coach
 January 20
 Karl Anderson, wrestler
 Philippe Cousteau Jr., American-born, French oceanographer
 January 21
 Abbie Betinis, composer
 Darnell Boone, boxer
 Troy Dumais, Olympic diver
 January 22
 Jake Grove, football player
 Christopher Masterson, actor and disc jockey
 January 23 – Marcus Arroyo, football player and coach
 January 24
 Rocky Boiman, football player and sportscaster
 Andrew Bolton, rower
 January 25
 Ty Carter, Afghan War veteran and Medal of Honor Recipient
 Michelle McCool, wrestler
 January 26
 Jarrod Bernstein, political consultant
 Albert Breer, football journalist
 Phil Dalhausser, Swiss-born Olympic volleyball player
 Danny Dietz, U.S. Navy SEAL (died 2005)
 January 28
 Jordan Black, football player
 Nick Carter, Backstreet Boys member, musician, actor, and author
 January 29 – Jason James Richter, actor
 January 30
 Lena Hall, actress and singer
 Josh Kelley, singer/songwriter
 Wilmer Valderrama, actor
 Lee Zeldin, politician
 January 31
 James Adomian, stand-up comedian, actor, and impressionist
 Stephen Baby, ice hockey player
 Joel Brown, hurdler
 April Lee Hernández, actress
 Tiffany Limos, actress

February

 February 1 – Kevin Cooke, politician
 February 3
 Felicia Ragland, basketball player 
 Skip Schumaker, baseball player
 February 4
 David Bulow, soccer player and coach (d. 2021)
 Brian Burg, basketball coach
 Malik Evans, politician, mayor of Rochester, New York
 February 5 – Paul DelVecchio, reality show personality 
 February 6
 Thomas Boatwright, comic book artist and writer
 Joel Bomgar, businessman and politician, founder of Bomgar Corporation
 Chanel Branch, politician
 Ryan Parmeter, wrestler
 Luke Ravenstahl, politician, Mayor of Pittsburgh
 February 7
 Kevin J. Boyle, politician
 Richie Castellano, musician 
 Chris Moss, basketball player
 February 8 – William Jackson Harper, actor
 February 9
 Shelly Martinez, wrestler and model
 Lauren McFall, actress 
 Manu Raju, journalist 
 February 11
 Tony Bua, football player
 Matthew Lawrence, actor
 February 12
 Robin Bain, actress, writer, and director
 Big Pooh, rapper
 Enver Gjokaj, actor
 Gucci Mane, rapper
 Christina Ricci, actress
 February 14 – Santonio Beard, football player (d. 2022)
 February 15 – Conor Oberst, singer/songwriter
 February 16
 Ashley Lelie, football player 
 Longineu W. Parsons III, drummer for Yellowcard (1997-2014)
 February 17 – Jason Ritter, actor and producer
 February 18
 Salman Bhojani, Pakistani-born lawyer and politician
 Regina Spektor, Russian-born singer/songwriter
 February 19 – Mike Miller, basketball player
 February 20 – Matt Behncke, soccer player and attorney
 February 21
 Nat Baldwin, bassist, improvisor, and songwriter
 Justin Roiland, animator, writer and voice actor
 February 22
 Arnaz Battle, football player
 Shamari Fears, singer-songwriter and actress  
 February 25
 Antonio Burks, basketball player
 Chris & Christy Knowings, twin actors
 February 26
 Brett Ballard, basketball coach
 Steve Blake, basketball player
 February 27
 Brandon Beemer, actor and model
 Bobby V, R&B singer
 Cyrus Bolooki, Drummer for New Found Glory
 Chelsea Clinton, Daughter of U.S. President Bill Clinton and U.S. Secretary of State Hillary Clinton
 February 28
 Darian Barnes, football player
 Tayshaun Prince, basketball player
 February 29
 Peter Scanavino, actor
 Taylor Twellman, soccer player and sportscaster

March

 March 1 – Carlos Curbelo, politician
 March 2 – Edmund McMillen, video game designer
 March 3 
 Kevin Aldridge, football player
 Kevin Burns, mixed martial artist
 Mason Unck, Professional football player
 Scott Voyles, conductor
 Katherine Waterston, British-born actress
 March 4
 Jack Hannahan, baseball player
 J. D. Scholten, politician
 Peter Hollens, singer/songwriter, producer and entrepreneur
 March 5
 Yan Bartelemí, Cuban-born boxer
 Shay Carl, vlogger and YouTube personality
 William Owens, Navy SEAL (d. 2017)
 March 6
 Daniel Arnold, photographer
 Awon, hip hop artist
 Blake Gottesman, politician 
 March 7
 Jeff Babcock, stock car racing driver
 Laura Prepon, actress, director, and author
 March 9
 Matt Barnes, basketball player 
 Matthew Gray Gubler, actor and filmmaker
 Gina Keatley, nutritionist 
 March 10
 Mike Andrade, politician
 Jen Atkin, influential hairstylist, entrepreneur, and columnist
 Chingy, rapper, singer and actor 
 Jesse Dee, singer
 Ahmaad Galloway, football player and coach (d. 2023)
 March 11
 Brent Barton, politician
 Neal Brown, football player and coach
 Chris Burke, baseball player
 March 12
 Christopher Bolduc, opera baritone singer
 March 13
 Caron Butler, basketball player
 Ahmad D. Brooks, football player
 March 14 – Willie Hurst, football player
 March 15
 Beth Bauer, golfer
 DJ Buddha, DJ, record producer, radio personality, music publisher, and record executive
 Freddie Bynum, baseball player
 Erica Grow, meteorologist 
 Josh Levin, writer and executive editor 
 March 16 – Todd Heap, football player 
 March 17
 Danny Califf, soccer player
 Katie Morgan, porn actress and radio host
 March 19 – Theo Von, television personality and comedian
 March 20
 Ricco Barrino, R&B singer/songwriter
 Jamal Crawford, basketball player
 Mikey Day, actor, comedian and writer
 March 21 – Jo Baker, English-born make-up artist
 March 22
 Shannon Bex, singer
 Bobby Blizzard, football player and coach
 March 24
 Black Pegasus, rapper and CEO of Brass Knuckle Entertainment
 Matthew Metzger, actor
 Dina Rizzo, field hockey player 
 March 25 – Neal Cotts, baseball player
 March 26
 John Bradford, soccer player
 Margaret Brennan, journalist
 Rosendo Rodriguez, serial killer (died 2018)
 Son Ho-young, singer in g.o.d
 March 27 – Greg Puciato, heavy metal musician and frontman for The Dillinger Escape Plan
 March 28 
 Rod Ferrell, convicted murderer 
 Rosie Mercado, plus-size model
 Nick Mondo, wrestler
 Luke Walton, basketball coach
 March 29
 Reuben 'Bonyx' Armstrong, producer and R&B artist
 China P. Arnold, convicted murderer
 Molly Brodak, poet, writer, and baker (d. 2020)
 March 30 – Bryan Anderson, football player
 March 31
 Kate Micucci, actress and voice artist
 Trenyce, singer

April

 April 1
 Bryan Buffington, actor
 Bijou Phillips, actress
 Randy Orton, wrestler and actor
 April 2
 Bobby Bones, radio personality
 Jeremy Bloom, football player and skier
 Jack Evans, wrestler
 Yung Joc, rapper
 Ricky Hendrick, race car driver (d. 2004)
 April 3
 Trevor Moore, actor and comedian (d. 2021)
 Brandan Schieppati, singer, bodybuilder, personal trainer, and frontman for Bleeding Through and Eighteen Visions (1997-2002)
 April 5
 Erik Audé, actor, stuntman, restaurateur, and poker player
 Matt Bonner, basketball player
 Mary Katharine Ham, journalist  
 April 7
 Michael Bellisario, actor 
 David Otunga, wrestler
 April 8
 Eric Aiken, boxer
 Carrie Savage, actress
 April 9 – Rachel Specter, actress 
 April 10
 Josh Burkman, mixed martial artist
 Kasey Kahne, racing driver
 April 11 – Mark Teixeira, baseball player
 April 12 – Elliot Ackerman, author and former Marine Corps Special Operations Team Leader
 April 13
 Colleen Clinkenbeard, voice actress
 Kelli Giddish, actress
 April 14
 Win Butler, American-born Canadian singer/songwriter, musician, and multi-instrumentalist
 Claire Coffee, actress
 Tom Franco, actor 
 Sarah McCoy, novelist
 April 15 – Aida Mollencamp, cook, food writer, and television personality
 April 16
 Jake Andrews, blues rock guitarist and singer/songwriter
 Paul London, wrestler
 April 17
 Nicholas D'Agosto, actor
 Brenda Villa, water polo player
 April 18
 Justin Amash, politician
 Scott Belsky, entrepreneur, author, early-stage investor, and co-creator of Behance
 April 19 – Jeremy Bridges, football player
 April 20
 Brian Allen, football player
 Chris Duffy, baseball player
 April 21
 Steve Bellisari, football player
 Tony Romo, football player
 April 22
 Brad Banks, football player
 Malcolm Barrett, actor
 April 23
 Jacob Bossman, politician
 Griffon Ramsey, artist 
 April 24
 Katherine Bailess, actress, singer, and dancer
 Danielle Borgman, soccer player
 Jamie Broadnax, film critic, podcaster, and writer
 Danny Gokey, 3rd place finalist on American Idol (season 8)
 Reagan Gomez-Preston, actress and voice actress
 Gavin Hickie, Irish-born rugby player and coach
 Austin Nichols, actor
 April 25 – Geoff Bennett, journalist
 April 26
 Jordana Brewster, actress and model
 Amin Joseph, actor
 Channing Tatum, actor, producer, and dancer
 April 28
 Illmind, record producer, songwriter, and educator
 Josh Howard, basketball player
 April 29
 Jason Anderson, football player
 Nathan Burton, football coach
 April 30
 Jon Awe, ice hockey player
 Brook Billings, volleyball player

May

 May 1 – Jay Reatard, musician (died 2010)  
 May 2
 Chris Boyles, decathlete
 Ellie Kemper, actress and comedian
 May 3 – Marcel Vigneron, chef
 May 4 – Greg Brown, baseball coach
 May 5
 Sandra Beasley, poet and writer
 Chad Bentz, baseball player
 Lara Berman, Israeli-born on-air news correspondent, journalist, actress, entrepreneur, and Pro-Israel activist
 Fasil Bizuneh, German-born long-distance runner
 Hank Green, entrepreneur, musician, educator, producer and vlogger
 Ike Taylor, football player
 May 6
 Brooke Bennett, Olympic swimmer
 Taebin, singer and TV host
 May 7 – Saeed Abedini, Iranian-born pastor
 May 9
 Erik Bottcher, politician
 Sarah Sokolovic, actress
 May 10 – Craig Brazell, baseball player
 May 11
 Nick Berk, wrestler
 Kulap Vilaysack, actress, comedian and Writer
 May 12
 Keith Bhonapha, football player and coach
 Keith Bogans, basketball player
 May 14
 Sarah Maestas Barnes, lawyer and politician
 James Bowman, lead guitarist and vocalist for Against Me!
 May 15
 Erica Bartolina, Olympic pole vaulter
 Josh Beckett, baseball player
 Cheri Blauwet, physician and Paralympic wheelchair racer
 May 17 – Jerome Beasley, basketball player
 May 18 – Barrett Baber, country, alternative, and rock musician
 May 19
 Mark Brown, football player
 Drew Fuller, actor and model
 May 20 – Chris Bagley, soccer player
 May 22 – Sharice Davids, politician, lawyer and mixed martial artist
 May 23
 Nate Boulton, politician
 Gary Brackett, football player
 Lane Garrison, actor
 May 24
 Jason Babin, football player
 Owen Benjamin, internet personality, stand-up comedian, and actor
 May 26 – Sean Barker, baseball player
 May 27
 Ben Feldman, actor
 Michael Steger, actor
 May 28
 Kadar Brock, casualist artist
 Josh Brooks, university sports administrator
 May 29 – Cha-seung Baek, South Korean-born baseball player
 May 31 – Andy Hurley, drummer of Fall Out Boy

June

 June 1
 Spencer Ackerman, journalist and writer
 Damien Fahey, MTV VJ, television host and drummer
 June 2 – Daniel Breaker, actor and comedian
 June 3 – The Blade, wrestler
 June 4
 Elizabeth Axtman, artist
 Bukkcity, Australian-born rapper
 Chris Pappas, politician
 June 5 – Jykine Bradley, American-born Canadian football player
 June 6
 Lauren Anderson, model
 Matt Belisle, baseball player
 Peter Mosely, rock musician
 June 7 – Nick Bobeck, football player and coach
 June 9 – David Oliver Cohen, writer, actor and entrepreneur
 June 10
 Jeff Bennett, baseball player
 Jessica DiCicco, actress and voice actress
 June 11
 Jennifer L. Armentrout, writer
 Lisa Donovan. youtuber
 June 12
 Brett Blizzard, basketball player
 Diem Brown, reality star (d. 2014)
 Larry Foote, American football player
 June 15
 Willie Allen, stock car racing driver
 Shanelle Jackson, politician
 Cara Zavaleta, television personality and model
 June 16
 Brandon Armstrong, basketball player
 Dewon Brazelton, baseball player
 Jason Smith, politician
 June 17
 Marion Christopher Barry, construction company owner (d. 2016)
 Jeph Jacques, webcomic writer
 Venus Williams, tennis player
 June 18
 Anthony Adams, television host, actor, comedian, and football player
 David Giuntoli, Actor
 June 19
 Neil Brown Jr., actor
 Jason White, football player
 June 20
 Chad Anderson, entrepreneur and executive, CEO of Space Angels
 Apollo Brown, hip hop musician and record producer
 June 21 – Richard Jefferson, basketball player
 June 22
 Davy Arnaud, soccer player and coach
 Brian Bowles, mixed martial artist
 Blake Moore, politician
 June 23
 Gabriel Bello, smooth jazz saxophonist, vocalist, and keyboardist
 Blair Herter, television personality
 Melissa Rauch, actress and comedian
 June 24
 Doug Bernier, baseball player
 Minka Kelly, actress
 Amirah Vann, actress 
 June 26
 Cody Bragg, soccer player
 Michael Vick, football player
 June 28 – Johntá Austin, singer/songwriter, arranger, producer, vocalist, and rapper
 June 29
 Jeneda Benally, bassist and vocalist for Blackfire
 Martin Truex Jr., race car driver
 June 30 – Gary Buchanan, basketball player

July

 July 1
 Alex Blagg, writer, comedian, and producer
 Riley Moore, politician
 July 2
 Kendrell Bell, football player
 Nicole Briscoe, sportscaster
 Sarah Buxton, country singer
 Brian Drolet, actor, producer and writer
 Nyjer Morgan, baseball player
 July 3
 Brandon Bernard, convicted robber, kidnapper, and murderer (d. 2020)
 Olivia Munn, actress and model
 Trae tha Truth, hip hop artist
 July 4 – Misty C. Bentz, astrophysicist and college professor
 July 5
 Paul "DJ Pauly D" DelVecchio, reality star
 Mads Tolling, Danish-born violinist
 Jason Wade, singer, guitarist, and frontman for Lifehouse
 Charles Klapow, choreographer and dance instructor
 July 6 – DJ Babey Drew, DJ, Grammy winning record producer, actor, radio and television personality
 July 7
 John Buck, baseball player
 Marika Domińczyk, Polish-born actress
 Deidre Downs, model and physician, Miss America 2005
 Michelle Kwan, Olympic figure skater
 July 9 – Jodi Arias, convicted murderer
 July 10
 Sally Barkow, Olympic sailor
 Brian Mast, politician
 Thomas Ian Nicholas, actor, singer, musician, producer, director and writer
 Adam Petty, racing driver (died 2000)
 James Rolfe, actor, director, and producer
 Nick Schifrin, journalist
 Jessica Simpson, singer
 Bret Taylor, computer programmer and entrepreneur, co-creator of Google Maps
 Adande Thorne, Trinidadian-American youtuber
 Jeremy Ray Valdez, actor and musician
 July 11
 Jenny Trout, author
 Justin Willman, magician, actor, entertainer, comedian, and television personality
 July 12 – Kristen Connolly, actress
 July 13
 Corey Clark, singer
 Cory Mills, politician
 July 15
 Reggie Abercrombie, baseball player
 Candace Brown, actress and comedian
 Robby Brown, football coach
 July 16 – Lindsey Berg, volleyball player
 July 17
 Derrick Allen, basketball player
 Ryan Miller, hockey player
 July 18
 Kristen Bell, actress
 David Blu, American–born Israeli basketball player
 Rufus Brown, football player
 July 19
 Adam Muto, writer, director and storyboard artist
 Mark Webber, actor
 July 20
 Ken Appledorn, actor
 Seth Flynn Barkan, poet and journalist
 Gisele Bündchen, Brazilian-born fashion model
 July 21
 Justin Griffith, football player
 CC Sabathia, baseball player
 July 22 – Rick Brattin, politician
 July 23
 Scott Buete, soccer player
 Josh Bush, football player
 July 24 – Joel Stroetzel, guitarist for Killswitch Engage
 July 25 – Erik Bickerstaff, football player
 July 26 – Jason Botts, baseball player
 July 27
 David Alvarez, politician
 Jessi Combs, racer, television personality, and metal fabricator (died 2019)
 Dolph Ziggler, wrestler
 July 28
 Mike Alvarado, boxer
 Dante Brown, football player
 Stephen Christian, singer/songwriter 
 Anthony Weaver, football player 
 July 29
 Ben Koller, drummer
 Rachel Miner, actress
 July 30
 Seth Avett, folk singer and founding member of The Avett Brothers
 Roberto Benitez, boxer

August

 August 1 – Nadia Bjorlin, actress, singer, and model
 August 2 – Diandra Asbaty, bowler
 August 3
 Nadia Ali, Libyan-born singer/songwriter
 Matthew Behrmann, tennis player
 Peter Burr, digital and new media artist
 August 4
 Asad Abdul-Khaliq, football player
 Emily Best, producer, entrepreneur, and founder and CEO of Seed&Spark
 August 6
 Will Pan, American-born Taiwanese singer/songwriter and actor
 Seneca Wallace, football player
 August 8
 Armenchik, Armenian-born pop singer
 Shayna Baszler, wrestler and martial artist
 Craig Breslow, baseball player 
 August 9 – Texas Battle, actor
 August 10 – Aaron Staton, actor
 August 11
 Hakim Akbar, football player
 Allison Baver, Olympic speed skater
 Kurt Birkins, baseball player
 August 12
 Maggie Lawson, actress
 Frankie Saenz, mixed martial artist
 Matt Thiessen, Canadian-born singer and frontman for Relient K
 August 13
 Richard Angulo, football player and coach
 Eric Appel, writer and director
 Jonah Bayliss, baseball player
 August 14
 Joseph Abruzzo, politician
 Michael Bauer, basketball player
 Roy Williams, football player
 August 15
 Mel Baggs, autistic and non-binary blogger (d. 2020)
 Jon Beutjer, football player
 Milford Brown, football player
 August 16
 Atari Blitzkrieg, hip hop artist
 Vanessa Carlton, singer/songwriter, and pianist
 Ryan Hanigan, baseball player
 August 17
 Derek Armstrong, politician
 Lindsey Leavitt, author
 David Legwand, hockey player
 August 18
 Anders Blewett, politician
 Ry Bradley, singer/songwriter and musician
 August 19 – B. J. Askew, football player
 August 21
 Chesa Boudin, politician
 John Brotherton, actor
 Paul Menard, race car driver
 August 23
 Merleyn Bell, politician
 Rex Grossman, football player
 August 24 – Zac Alcorn, football player
 August 25
 Casey Atwood, stock car racing driver
 T. J. Bell, stock car racing driver
 August 26
 Eric Basaldua, comic book artist
 Jim BEANZ, singer/songwriter, actor, and vocal producer
 Jimmy Blewett, NASCAR Whelen Modified Tour driver
 Macaulay Culkin, actor
 Chris Pine, actor
 August 27 – Derrick Strait, football player 
 August 28
 Tully Banta-Cain, football player
 T. J. Beam, baseball player
 Jimmy Blacklock, attorney and judge
 Debra Lafave, teacher and convicted sex offender
 August 29
 Matt Bell, author and writer
 William Levy, Cuban-born actor
 David West, basketball player
 August 30
 Russ Adams, baseball player
 Adam Bergman, cyclist
 Colin Branch, football player
 August 31 – Joe Budden, media personality and rapper

September

 September 1 – Bruno Agra, Brazilian-born heavy metal drummer
 September 2 – Gerry Rosenthal, actor
 September 3
 Caleb Miller, football player
 Jennie Finch, softball player
 September 4
 Zachary Abel, actor
 DJ Bonics, hip hop disk jockey
 Septerber 6
 Blaze Berdahl, actress
 Jillian Hall, wrestler
 September 7
 Raj Bhavsar, Olympic artistic gymnast
 J.D. Pardo, actor
 Mark Prior, baseball player 
 September 8
 Daniel Arsham, artist
 Eric Hutchinson, singer/songwriter 
 Neferteri Shepherd, model and actress 
 September 9 
 Denise Quiñones, Puerto Rican-born actress, Miss Universe 2001  
 Michelle Williams, actress
 September 10
 Trevor Murdoch, wrestler
 Mikey Way, bassist for My Chemical Romance
 September 11 – Tanisha Brito, beauty pageant titleholder
 September 12
 Wendell Bryant, football player
 Sean Burroughs, baseball player 
 Joe Loeffler, bassist for Chevelle
 September 13
 Curtis Borchardt, basketball player
 Ben Savage, actor
 September 14 – Nicole Abusharif, convicted murderer
 September 15
 Tammie Brown, drag queen and television personality
 Bump J, rapper
 Ben Woolf, actor (died 2015)
 September 16
 Jake Anderson, fishing captain and television personality
 Peter Bailey, author and journalist
 Vanessa Peters, singer and songwriter
 September 18 – Jonathan Biss, pianist, teacher, and writer
 September 19
 J. R. Bremer, American-born Bosnian basketball player
 Phillip Buchanon, football player
 Josh Haeder, politician
 September 20 – Francis Awerkamp, politician
 September 21
 Aslyn, pop singer/songwriter
 Brianna Keilar, journalist
 Autumn Reeser, actress
 September 25
 Jeremiah Bitsui, actor
 T.I., rapper, film and music producer, actor, and author
 September 26 – J. P. Blecksmith, Marine Corp 2nd Lieutenant (d. 2004)
 September 27 – Paul Arnold, football player
 September 28
 Reggie Brown, writer, actor, and comedic impersonator
 Chrissy Metz, Actress
 September 29
 Tony Brown, football player
 Zachary Levi, actor and singer
 September 30
 Virgil Abloh, fashion designer (died 2021)
 Bryan Bullington, baseball player
 Mike Donehey, Christian singer/songwriter, guitarist, and frontman for Tenth Avenue North
 Emily Kokal, rock vocalist and guitarist

October

 October 1
 La Farrell Bunting, boxer
 Sarah Drew, actress
 October 2 – Shane Andrus, football player
 October 3
 Timothy Barr, politician
 Anquan Boldin, football player
 October 4
 Me'Lisa Barber, sprinter
 Mikele Barber, sprinter
 Jackie Burns, actor and singer
 Joe Kennedy III, politician
 Lucian Piane, composer and music producer
 Jason Samuels Smith, tap dancer
 Morgan Spector, actor
 October 5
 Roy Anderson, football player
 Craig Benzine, video producer, musician, and vlogger
 Ti West, film director
 October 6 – Rod Babers, football player
 October 8
 Jenni Branam, soccer player
 Nick Cannon, comedian, rapper, and television host
 The Miz, reality star, wrestler, and actor
 October 9 – Justin Cronin, politician (died 2020)
 October 10
 Terreal Bierria, football player
 Mark Castillo, metalcore drummer for Bury Your Dead
 Tony Gonzales, politician
 October 11 – Meghann Burke, soccer player
 October 13
 Ashanti, singer/songwriter, record producer, model, dancer, and actress
 Jon Micah Sumrall, singer and frontman for Kutless
 October 14
 John Edgar Browning, author, editor, and scholar
 Terrence McGee, football player
 October 15 – Jamie Burke, rugby player
 October 16
 Brad Balukjian, writer and science professor
 Sue Bird, American-born Israeli basketball player
 October 17
 Seth Baum, researcher and executive director of GCRI
 David Black, photographer and director
 Nicholas Britell, composer, pianist, and film producer
 Sarah Lamb, ballerina
 Tarell Alvin McCraney, playwright and actor 
 Angel Parker, actress 
 Justin Shenkarow, actor 
 October 18 
 Erin Dean, actress  
 Josh Gracin, singer  
 Colby Keller, visual artist, blogger and pornographic film actor
 October 19 – Barrington Bartley, Jamaican-born cricketer
 October 20 – Mike Brown, producer, engineer, songwriter, multi-instrumentalist, and founder of Temperamental Recordings
 October 21
 Coretta Brown, basketball player
 Kim Kardashian, socialite and television personality
 October 22 – D. Bryant, football player
 October 23 – Robert Belushi, actor 
 October 24
 Kamia Brown, politician
 Monica, singer/songwriter, actress, and businesswoman
 Casey Wilson, actress and comedian
 October 25
 Sara Benincasa, comedian, author, and actress
 Mehcad Brooks, actor and model
 Torrey Butler, basketball player
 October 26 – Ifeoma Ajunwa, Nigerian-born legal scholar, writer, and tenured professor of law at the University of North Carolina School Of Law
 October 28
 Wes Ball, film director, visual effects artist, and graphic artist
 Christy Hemme, wrestler
 Hunter Hillenmeyer, football player
 Kevin Lincoln, politician, mayor of Stockton, California
 October 29
 Heidi Androl, television sports reporter
 Ben Foster, actor
 October 30
 Chris Barth, singer/songwriter and multi-instrumentalist
 Steve Soboslai, singer/songwriter, guitarist, and frontman for Punchline
 October 31
 Jeff Albert, baseball coach
 Samaire Armstrong, actress and fashion designer
 Marc Berman, politician
 Jason Shrout, drummer
 Eddie Kaye Thomas, actor and comedian

November

 November 2
 Karamo Brown, television personality and culture coach
 Barbara Buffaloe, politician, mayor of Columbia, Missouri
 November 3 – Joey Allcorn, country singer/songwriter
 November 4
 Morgan Babst, author
 Wes Burton, stock car racing driver
 George Huff, singer
 November 5 – James Burchett, politician
 November 6 – Brad Baker, baseball player
 November 7
 Shea Arender, symphony producer, entrepreneur, Broadway producer, and CEO/owner of Las Vegas Symphony Orchestra
 Shannon Bahrke, Olympic freestyle skier and entrepreneur
 Miles Bonny, record producer, singer/songwriter, trumpeter, and DJ
 Timothy Brindle, Christian hip hop lyricist
 November 9 – Vanessa Lachey, model
 November 10
 Troy Bell, basketball player
 Susan Bush, soccer player
8 Donté Stallworth, American football player
 November 11
 Louis Blessing, politician
 Nicole Malliotakis, politician
 Willie Parker, football player  
 November 12
 Trent Acid, wrestler (d. 2010)
 Meghan Allen, model and television personality
 McKinley Bailey, politician
 Franck Bohbot, photographer
 Lance Briggs, football player
 November 13
 Josh Blankenship, football player and coach
 Monique Coleman, actress
 Sara Del Ray, wrestler
 November 14
 Randall Bal, swimmer
 Allison Bradshaw, tennis player
 Ben Harper, guitarist for Yellowcard (1997-2005), Amber Pacific (2006), and HeyMike!
 November 15 – Ace Young, singer/songwriter and actor
 November 16
 Kayte Christensen, basketball player
 Josh A. Moore, basketball player
 Eric Swalwell, politician
 Susan Kelechi Watson, actress
 November 17
 Jay Bradley, wrestler
 Isaac Hanson, guitarist and singer for Hanson
 November 18
 Denny Hamlin, race car driver
 Dustin Kensrue, singer/songwriter, guitarist, and frontman for Thrice
 November 19
 Courtney Anderson, football player
 Jamison Brewer, basketball player
 Nick Browne, football player
 November 20
 Richard Alston, football player
 Crystal Anthony, cyclo-cross cyclist
 November 21 
 Hank Blalock, baseball player
 Alec Brownstein, creative marketer, book author, and director
 Tim Lambesis, singer and frontman for As I Lay Dying
 November 22 – Tim Anderson, football player
 November 23
 David Britz, scientist and engineer
 Jonathan Papelbon, baseball player 
 November 24 – Beth Phoenix, wrestler  
 November 25
 Valerie Azlynn, actress
 John-Michael Liles, hockey player 
 Nick Swisher, baseball player
 November 26 – Jessica Bowman, actress
 November 28
 Bea Bielik, tennis player
 Angelica Ross, actress and businesswoman
 November 29
 Janina Gavankar, actress and musician
 Jason Griffith, actor and voice actor 
 November 30
 Guerin Austin, television host, model, and beauty queen
 Jimmy Baxter, American-born Jordanian basketball player
 Shane Victorino, baseball player

December

 December 1 – Angelique Bates, actress, comedian, and rapper
 December 2
 Jona Bechtolt, electronic musician and multimedia artist
 Mario Bokara, wrestler
 December 3 
 Anna Chlumsky, actress
 Jenna Dewan, actress and dancer
 Jim Sorgi, football player
 December 7 – Dan Bilzerian, poker player, businessman, and social media influencer
 December 8
 Juliette Danielle, actress
 Lisa Kelly, reality star and truck driver
 Will Long, artist and musician
 December 9
 Simon Helberg, actor, comedian and musician
 Bárbara Padilla, Mexican-born opera singer
 December 10
 Sarah Chang, violinist
 Kate Reinders, actress and singer
 December 11
 Joe Blanton, baseball player
 Matías Boeker, tennis player
 December 12 – Donny Boaz, actor
 December 13
 Alan Alborn, Olympic ski jumper
 Nathalia Holt, author
 December 14 – Sam Aiken, football player
 December 15
 Bobby Bradley, baseball player
 December 16
 Kristen Arnett, author
 Greg Brooks, football player
 Holly Merrill Raschein, politician
 Stuart Schuffman, travel writer
 December 18
 Christina Aguilera, singer/songwriter, actress and television personality
 Jared Moskowitz, politician
 D. J. Trahan, golfer
 Baron Vaughn, actor and comedian
 December 19
 Derek Abney, football player
 Gregory Douglass, singer/songwriter
 Jake Gyllenhaal, actor
 Eddie Jackson, chef and football player
 Hunter Johnson, wrestler
 Marla Sokoloff, actress
 December 21
 Nicholas William Bailey, composer and songwriter
 SirValiant Brown, basketball player
 J. P. Reese, mixed martial artist
 Royce Ring, baseball player
 December 22 – Chris Carmack, actor 
 December 23
 Yadira Caraveo, politician
 Rory O'Malley, actor and gay rights activist
 Cody Ross, baseball player
 December 24
 Benjamin Barger, Olympic windsurfer
 Dutch Boyd, poker player
 December 27
 Bernard Berrian, football player
 Elizabeth Rodriguez, actress
 December 30
 Chalise Baysa, American-born Filipino football player and manager
 Eliza Dushku, actress and model

Full Date Unknown
 Zainab Ahmad, lawyer
 Indira Allegra, artist and writer
 Dmitri Alperovitch, Russian-born computer security industry executive, co-founder and former chief technology officer of CrowdStrike
 César Alvarez, composer, lyricist, and playwright
 Ahmed Aly, snooker player
 Emilie Amundson, educator and government administrator
 Joanna Angel, pornographic and mainstream actress, director, and adult film writer
 Romina Arena, Italian-born popera singer/songwriter
 David Armand, writer and author
 Sam Ashworth, songwriter, producer, and recording artist
 Imran Awan, Pakistani-born information technology worker
 Yimon Aye, Burmese-born chemist and molecular biologist
 Erica Baker, engineer and Chief Technology Officer for the DCCC
 Jimmy Baker, artist and professor
 Kelly J. Baker, writer
 Emily Balskus, chemical biologist, enzymologist, microbiologist, and biochemist
 J. Campbell Barker, judge
 Michel Barrera, wanted fugitive
 Joe Bartholdi Jr., poker player
 Travis Beacham, screenwriter
 Ryan Berman, politician
 James S. Bielo, socio-cultural anthropologist
 Christophe Bisciglia, entrepreneur
 Seth Bogart, artist and musician
 Leydy Bonilla, bachata singer
 David Tai Bornoff, writer, advertising creative director, photographer, film director, and multimedia artist
 Martha Bowen, swimmer
 Michele Boyd, actress, producer, and host
 Thomas Bradshaw, playwright
 Josh Brand, artist
 Marie Brennan, fantasy author
 Steve Brinster, disc golfer
 Dan Bronoske, politician
 Kristi Brooks, author
 Adrien Broom, art photographer
 Aaron Brown, Australian-born violinist, composer, and teacher
 Box Brown, cartoonist
 Jesse Brune, chef, personal trainer and lifestyle coach
 Caleb Burhans, composer, singer, and multi-instrumentalist
 Gregory Burks, basketball player
 Justin Busch, politician
 David McRae, politician

Deaths
 January 1 – Frank Wykoff, relay sprinter (b. 1909)
 January 8 – John Mauchly, physicist and inventor (born 1907)
 January 10
 Hughie Critz, baseball player and scout (b. 1900)
 George Meany, plumber and trade union leader (b. 1894)
 Bo Rein, American football player and coach (b. 1945)
 January 17 – Barbara Britton, actress (born 1919)
 January 19 – William O. Douglas, Supreme Court Justice (born 1898)
 January 23 – Leonard Strong, actor (born 1908)
 January 25 – David Newell, actor (born 1905)
 January 29 – Jimmy Durante, actor, singer and comedian (born 1893)
 January 30
 Professor Longhair, musician (born 1918)
 Warren Smith, singer and guitarist (born 1932)
 February 1 – Jack Bailey, television host (Queen for a Day) (b. 1907)
 February 2 – William Howard Stein, chemist, Nobel Prize laureate (born 1911)
 February 6 – Albert Kotin, abstract expressionist painter (born 1907)
 February 8 – Isadora Bennett, publicity agent (born 1900)
 February 12 – Muriel Rukeyser, poet (born 1913)
 February 13 
 David Janssen, actor (born 1931)
 Mike Monroney, U.S. Senator from Oklahoma from 1951 to 1969 (b. 1902)
 February 17 – Jerry Fielding, conductor and music director (born 1922)
 February 18 – Gale Robbins, singer and actress (born 1921)
 February 20 
 Joseph Banks Rhine, parapsychologist (born 1895)
 Alice Roosevelt Longworth, youngest daughter of Theodore Roosevelt (born 1884)
 February 23 – Robert Hayden, poet and essayist, first African-American Poet Laureate (born 1913)
 February 27 – George Tobias, actor (born 1901). 
 February 28 – James Goff, American football and basketball head coach (born 1912)
 February 29 – Gil Elvgren, pin-up artist (born 1914)
 March 3 – Roger Davis, actor (born 1884)
 March 10 – Herman Tarnower, medical doctor and diet guru (born 1910; murdered)
 March 11 – Maud Hart Lovelace, author (born 1892)
 March 18 – Jessica Dragonette, singer (born 1900)
 March 21 – Peter Stoner, mathematician, astronomer and Christian apologist (born 1888) 
 March 25
 James Wright, poet (born 1927) 
 Milton H. Erickson, psychiatrist (born 1901)  
 March 28 – James Hayes, American-born Filipino Roman Catholic, Jesuit archbishop, missionary and servant of God (born 1889)
 March 30 – David Sharpe, actor (born 1910)  
 April 2 – Stanley Forman Reed, Supreme Court Justice (born 1884) 
 April 4 – Red Sovine, country and folk singer-songwriter (born 1917)  
 April 15
 Raymond Bailey, actor (born 1904)  
 Marshall Reed, film and television actor (born 1917)
 April 18 – Antonio Caponigro, gangster (born 1912)  
 April 19 – Charles Seel, actor (born 1897)  
 April 20 – Katherine Kennicott Davis, composer (born 1892) 
 April 28 – Thomas G. W. Settle, record-setting balloonist and admiral (born 1895)  
 May 1 – Henry Levin, film director and actor (born 1909)  
 May 30 – Carl Radle, bassist (born 1942)
 June 1 – Rube Marquard, baseball player and manager (b. 1886)
 June 7
 Richard Bonelli, opera baritone (born 1889)
 Philip Guston, painter (born 1912)
 Henry Miller, writer (born 1891)
 June 12 – Milburn Stone, actor (born 1904)
 June 23 – Clyfford Still, painter (born 1904)
 July 7
 Dore Schary, film writer, director and producer (born 1905)
 Dan White, actor (born 1908) 
 July 15 – Ben Selvin, orchestra leader and recording artist (born 1898)  
 July 17 – Red Barry, actor (born 1912)  
 July 25 – Tony Catalano, American football player (born 1895)
 July 26 – Allen Hoskins, actor (born 1920)
 July 31 – Bobby Van, actor, singer, and dancer (born 1928)
 August 1 – Strother Martin, actor (born 1919)  
 August 2 – Donald Ogden Stewart, writer (born 1894) 
 August 9
Ruby Hurley, civil rights activist (born 1909)
Elliott Nugent, actor (born 1896)
 August 14
 Paul Snider, Canadian murderer, died in Los Angeles, California (b. 1951)
 Dorothy Stratten, Canadian model, actress, and murder victim, died in Los Angeles, California (b. 1960)
 August 15 – William Hood Simpson, general (born 1888) 
 August 27 – Douglas Kenney, comedy writer and author (born 1946)  
 September 3
 Barbara O'Neil, actress (born 1909)
 Duncan Renaldo, actor (born 1904) 
 September 6 – Hale Woodruff, artist (born 1900) 
 September 30 – John McGuire, actor (born 1929)  
 October 10 – Billie "Buckwheat" Thomas, actor (born 1931)  
 October 14 – Mary O'Hara, author and screenwriter (born 1885)
 October 25 – Virgil Fox, organist (born 1912)  
 October 27 – Red Conkright, football player and coach (b. 1914)
 October 28 – Leon Janney, actor (b. 1917)
 October 31 – Elizebeth Smith Friedman, cryptographer (born 1892)  
 November 1 – Sherri Jarvis, murder victim who was unidentified for 41 years (b. 1966) 
 November 7 – Steve McQueen, actor (b. 1930)
 November 9
 Carmel Myers, actress (born 1899) 
 Victor Sen Yung, actor (born 1915) 
 November 29 – Dorothy Day, journalist and social activist (b. 1897)
 December 4 – Stanisława Walasiewicz (Stella Walsh), track and field athlete, born in Poland (b. 1911)
 December 8 – John Lennon, British musician, singer, songwriter, and murder victim, died in New York City (b. 1940)
 December 11 – Dorothy West, actress (born 1891)  
 December 14 – Elston Howard, baseball player (born 1929)  
 December 16 - Colonel Sanders, founder of Kentucky Fried Chicken (born 1890)
 December 26 – Richard Chase, serial killer (born 1950)
 December 28 – Sam Levene, actor (born 1905)

See also 
 1980 in American television
 List of American films of 1980
 Timeline of United States history (1970–1989)

References

External links
 

 
1980s in the United States
United States
United States
Years of the 20th century in the United States